Black Hole is a fixed shooter arcade video game released by Tokyo Denshi Sekkei in 1981.  Players must shoot splitting "neutron mines" and flying saucers.

Gameplay

References

1981 video games
Arcade video games
Arcade-only video games
Fixed shooters
Video games developed in Japan